Bob Izumi (born May 2, 1958) is a Canadian professional angler, and the host of Bob Izumi's Real Fishing Show. He is most known for his success in bass fishing, and has won numerous bass tournaments.

Personal life
Izumi grew up in a family of several children, son of Joe Izumi. He grew up in the small town of Blenheim, Ontario. His father initiated the first Canadian bass tournament, hence Izumi had been exposed to fishing since an early stage in life. He went to Blenheim District High School in Blenheim, Ontario. His brother, Wayne Izumi, is also a professional angler. Izumi has a wife and two children.

Real Fishing Show
At a family picnic, a family member brought up the possibility of him starting a fishing television show. Izumi had been hired to do seminars before that time, and the thought of a television show intrigued him. He filmed a pilot episode, and the show was soon picked up by various networks in 1983. The show is still produced and runs on many networks, including WFN and Global Television Network.

References

Canadian fishers
Canadian people of Japanese descent
Living people
1958 births
Canadian television hosts